Miente y serás feliz ("Lie and be Happy") is a 1940 Mexican film. It stars Carlos Orellana.

External links
 

1940 films
1940s Spanish-language films
Mexican black-and-white films
Mexican comedy films
1940 comedy films
1940s Mexican films